Zidigan (Yetegän) is a rural locality (a village) in Bolshekarkalinksy Selsoviet, Miyakinsky District, Bashkortostan, Russia. The population was 54 as of 2010. There are 2 streets.

Geography 
Zidigan is located 25 km southeast of Kirgiz-Miyaki (the district's administrative centre) by road. Dubrovka is the nearest rural locality.

References 

Rural localities in Miyakinsky District